

J'son of Spartax

J2

Jack Flag

Jack Frost

Gregor Shapanka

Jack O'Lantern

Jason Macendale

Steven Mark Levins

Daniel Berkhart

Levins' brother

Jeremiah

Jack of Hearts

Jackal

Miles Warren

Ben Reilly

Jackdaw

Jackdaw is a fictional character featured in the Marvel Comics universe. He was created by Dez Skinn, Steve Parkhouse, Paul Neary and John Stokes, and first appeared in The Incredible Hulk Weekly #57  (April 1980).

A now-deceased hero, the sidekick of Captain Britain, Jackdaw was an Otherworld elf. Jackdaw had been mortally wounded earlier in his adventures, but was revived by Merlyn and given new powers and a new costume.

He was permanently slain later on Earth-238 by The Fury. Jackdaw was literally torn in half by one of the Fury's energy bolts and expired shortly thereafter in Captain Britain's arms. Jackdaw expressed a belief that Merlyn would resurrect him. Saturnyne had abandoned them (and her assistant Dimples, who loved her deeply) to escape. Merlyn did not resurrect Jackdaw as it would have damaged his chances of rescuing Captain Britain, who was killed as well by the Fury after Dimples and Jackdaw, and resurrected by Merlyn back on Earth-616.

Jackhammer

Jackpot

Brent Jackson

Jade Dragon
Jade Dragon is a fictional character portrayed in the Marvel Comics universe. He was created by Jim Krueger, Alex Ross, and John Paul Leon, and first appeared in Earth X #2 (May 1999).

Little is known of Jade Dragon's history before his exposure to Terrigen Mist on Earth-9997. Once exposed to the mist, he mutated into a humanoid dragon and became a slave to the Skull, who gained the ability to control the minds of others after exposure to the mist. The Skull intended to take over first New York City, then the world. Along with the Skull's other slaves, he was forced to fight a team of super-mutants led by Captain America; in the end, the Skull was killed and his slaves were freed.

Jade Dragon would move on to work alongside Iron Maiden, Black Bolt, and the Iron Avengers.

As part of his transformation by the mist, Jade Dragon gained functional wings with the ability to fly and the ability to blow jade-green flames from his mouth.

Sajani Jaffrey

J. Jonah Jameson

John Jameson

Jann of the Jungle

Janus

Jarella

Jarvis

Edwin Jarvis

Jason

Jerry Jaxon

Jazinda

Jemiah the Analyzer

Jester

Jonathan Powers

Jody Putt

Unnamed

Jetstream

Jiang Li
Jiang Li is a fictional character who originated in the Marvel Cinematic Universe as Ying Li before appearing in Marvel comics. The character, created by David Callaham, Destin Daniel Cretton and Andrew Lanham, appeared in Shang-Chi and the Legend of the Ten Rings (2021). Ying Li was an original character created for the film who replaces Shang-Chi's unnamed white American mother from the comics, created by Steve Englehart and Jim Starlin per mandate by then editor-in-chief Roy Thomas, who was genetically selected by Zheng Zu to be the mother of his progeny. When the cast for the film was announced by Kevin Feige, the character was originally named Jiang Li before being changed to Ying Li; the former name was later used for the character's introduction in the comics.

Jiang Li in comics
Jiang Li made her comic book debut in Shang-Chi (vol. 2) #4 (September 2021), created by Gene Luen Yang and Dike Ruan. Jiang Li was born into one of Ta-Lo's few communities of mortals known as the Qilin Riders who were appointed by the Xian as guardians of the gateway connecting Ta-Lo to Qilin Island in the East China Sea.  While on patrol, Jiang Li rescued a shipwrecked Zheng Zu from pirates. Jiang Li nursed Zu back to health and the two fell in love. However, Jiang Li's father, Chieftain Xin, was outraged over her harboring an outsider and ordered her to return to Ta-Lo with Zu's head. Instead, Jiang Li and Zu fled to Zu's House of the Deadly Hand in Hunan, where Jiang Li discovered Zu's true identity as the leader of the Five Weapons Society, a criminal organization. Jiang Li attempted to leave him, but Zu pleaded with her to stay, promising to change his dark ways. True to his word, Zu rediscovered his own humanity from Jiang Li and the two married and had two children: Shang-Chi and Shi-Hua. However following an attack by Hydra against the House of the Deadly Hand, Zu became cold and distant towards his family, as he felt that his love for them made him weak. Out of loneliness, Jiang Li sent a letter to her father and a few weeks later was drawn to a confrontation between Xin and Zu in the latter's personal tower, where it was revealed that Zu had constructed a makeshift portal to Ta Lo to steal the realm's sacred weapons to bolster the Society. While Zu fought his wife and father-in-law, Shang-Chi happened upon the scene, just as the portal's connection to Ta Lo became disconnected and Jiang Li was accidentally pushed through to her presumed death.

Instead, Jiang Li was sent to the Negative Zone, where she used her psionic abilities to mentally link with the native mantid creatures, who protected and sheltered her. Jiang Li resided in the Negative Zone for many years, occasionally using her psionic abilities to reach out to her children. After Shang-Chi took over the Five Weapons Society following Zu's death and began reforming it as a heroic organization, he began receiving Jiang Li's messages through his dreams and travelled to the Negative Zone with his half-siblings to rescue her. While she recuperated at the New House of the Deadly Hand in Chinatown, Manhattan, she is secretly visited by her father. Despite claiming to being overjoyed to see her again, Xin is consumed by his rage towards Zu and his bloodline since his earlier confrontation with them and believes Shang-Chi to be as evil as his father, vowing to put an end to his grandson.

Due to being mentally linked to insects for many years, Jiang Li takes a while to recover her mental health but spends time with her son and his half-siblings. After she fully recovers, Jiang Li begins telling Shang-Chi their family history but the two are attacked by several enemies of the Society. Jiang Li uses her psionic abelites to realize that they are being led by Xin. Although Shang-Chi and the Society are able to defeat the would-be assassins, Jiang Li is taken hostage by them, forcing Shang-Chi to let them escape. Although Xin is outraged over their failure to kill Shang-Chi and for kidnapping his daughter, he allows his allies to escape with Jiang Li through a portal to Qilin Island and through the gateway to Ta Lo. After failing to acquire Shang-Chi's corpse to complete his magic, Xin forcibly extracts Jiang Li's psionic energy to locate Shi-Hua for his ritual. Xin returns with Shi-Hua's severed right hand, which he uses to create taotie masks for himself and the Qilin Riders. Jiang Li escapes by psionically bonding with a nearby qilin and travels back to Earth to help the Society defend the House of the Deadly Hand from the mask empowered Riders.  Jiang Li briefly faces off against her father, who is empowered by his own mask and several of the heavenly Ten Rings but helped by the arrival of Shang-Chi and his siblings. When Shang-Chi succumbs to his inner darkness to take the Ten Rings from Xin and defeats him and the Riders, he attempts to sever Xin's hand in retaliation for what he did to Shi-Hua but Jiang Li and his siblings talk him down, bringing him back to his senses. Jiang Li and Shang-Chi return to Ta Lo for Xin to face justice and to return the Ten Rings to the Jade Emperor, who appoints Jiang Li as the new Chieftain of the Qilin Riders, which requires her to remain in Ta Lo.

Powers and abilities
As a Qilin Rider, Jiang Li is blessed by the Xian with the power of innate archery and to psionically link with qilin. Jiang Li can also extend her psionic abilities to other individuals, including humans and aliens. She is also proficient in martial arts.

Jiang Li in film
Ying Li appears in Shang-Chi and the Legend of the Ten Rings, portrayed by Fala Chen.  In the film, Li is a guardian of Ta Lo, a mystical realm inhabited by Chinese mythological creatures, including its guardian dragon, the Great Protector, who blesses Li with the power to manipulate wind.  In 1996, the immortal warlord Xu Wenwu attempts to invade Ta Lo but is defeated by Li.  The two fall in love but when Wenwu is rejected by Ta Lo's inhabitants for his dark past, Li leaves with him.  The two marry and have two children: son Shang-Chi and daughter Xialing.  Wenwu abandons his organization and weapons while Li forgoes the blessing of the Great Protector to be with each other and their children.  While Wenwu is away, Li is murdered by the Iron Gang, old enemies of the Ten Rings. Li's death prompts Wenwu to violently murder the gang in retaliation and reverts back to his dark ways by reclaiming his Rings and organization. Years later, the Dweller-in-Darkness uses Li's voice to make Wenwu believe that his wife is still alive and trapped within a gate in Ta Lo, so that Wenwu can use his Rings to destroy its seal.  Wenwu attempts to convince his estranged children to help him free their mother and destroy her village in retaliation for imprisoning her, but the two side with Li's people. Shang-Chi and Xialing are gifted suits of armor crafted from the Great Protector's scales that Li entrusted to her sister Ying Nan. After the battle, Shang-Chi and Xialing light paper lanterns in memory of Li and Wenwu, who was killed by the Dweller.

Jigsaw

Jimmy-6

Joan

Jocasta

John the Skrull

Johnny Dee

Otis and Adina Johnson
Otis Johnson and Adina Johnson are the parents of Tyrone Johnson (the superhero known as Cloak) in Marvel Comics. The characters, created by Bill Mantlo and Rick Leonardi, made their sole appearance in Cloak and Dagger #4 (January 1984).

While their names have never been revealed in the comics, for the convenience of this section they will be referred to by their names in the TV series with their son renamed Otis Jr. Michael and Adina had four children, Tyrone, Otis Jr., Anna and an unnamed daughter. The Johnsons met with Tyrone's teacher when they discovered that despite Tyrone being a gifted basketball player, he had a stutter which worried the Johnsons. Beyond that not much is known about them, but it is assumed that they have been in grief due to Tyrone having run away which may have further affected them by the death of their daughter and imprisonment of Otis Johnson Jr.

The Johnsons in other media
Otis and Adina appear in the Freeform series Marvel's Cloak & Dagger portrayed by Miles Mussenden and Gloria Reuben respectively. Earlier promotion had Otis named Michael but this was changed shortly before filming. Otis has a desk job (at an unknown place) while Andina works at Roxxon Gulf. Otis and Andina work to have their son Tyrone grow up to a better future even after their other son Billy Johnson's death. It is revealed that Otis has an association with the Wild Red Hawks, a group of Mardi Gras Indians that Otis had Billy do work with on an earlier occasion. Otis and Adina are shown to be at loss on the anniversary of Billy's death. While Otis has the Wild Red Hawks over, Adina's work ID is borrowed by Tandy Bowen to confront Peter Scarborough. Police Chief Duchamp informs Otis and Adina that Detective Connors has been suspended pending investigation; neither Otis or Adina react to it. At her job, Adina is shown having an unheard conversation with one of the workers. Later that night, Adina tells Tyrone that she wanted to protect her son from the police. When the police arrive outside their home to arrest Tyrone for supposedly killing Officer Fuchs, Adina tells Tyrone to run. Otis hears about what happened, confronting Tyrone looking for the cloak at the Wild Red Hawks' meeting place. Otis gives the cloak and tells his son to get far away from here and to stay out of contact with them. After the Terrors' crisis is over, Otis and Adina are later seen with the police and Father Delgado as Adina later finds something that Tyrone left for her. Otis and Adina later take a break from each other in light of Tyrone being a fugitive. When Connors wants redemption from Tyrone, Connors is taken to Otis where Connors mentions how Senator Asa Henderson hid information about the cover-up on Billy's death. When it has been moved from the location that Senator Henderson had it, Tyrone takes Connors to Adina for the next course of action. Adina is torn between avenging Billy's death or keeping Connors alive for Tyrone. Connors does mention to Adina where Billy's body is buried. After covering her bathroom in plastic, Adina tricks Connors into going into freshen up and then shoots Connors. Adina visits and convinces Delgado to be a priest again so that they can help Tyrone. She confesses that as soon as she got proof of Tyrone's innocence, she killed Connors. Otis and Adina reunite where they watch the news of Tyrone being cleared of all charges and the news about Senator Henderson's arrest for his cover-up.

Otis Johnson Jr.
Otis Johnson Jr. is the brother of Tyrone Johnson (the superhero known as Cloak) in Marvel Comics. The character, created by Bill Mantlo and June Brigman, made his sole appearance in Cloak and Dagger (vol. 2) #11 (March 1987).

While his name is simply Otis in the comics, for the convenience of this section he will be referred to as Otis Jr. due to the preceding section. Otis Jr. is the son of Otis Sr. and Adina Johnson. He is the younger brother of Tyrone and the older brother to Anna and an unnamed sister. Not much is known about him other than that he looked up to Tyrone, but after he ran away he and the family spiraled. Otis Jr. resorted to becoming a dope pusher and hooked his sister Anna who overdosed causing him to get arrested.

Otis Johnson Jr. in other media
The character renamed William "Billy" Johnson appears in the Freeform series Marvel's Cloak & Dagger played by Marqus Clae. His character is an amalgamation of the older brother and Billy (Tyrone's murdered friend) from the comics. After Tyrone had reclaimed property from a guy who ripped off Billy and his friends, Billy took Tyrone to return it only to run into trouble with Detective James Connors. During a confrontation at the dock the night when Roxxon's oil platform collapsed, Billy was shot by Connors and falls into the water as Tyrone jumps in after him, leading to Tyrone getting powers. Andre Deschaine's powers shows Tandy in different lives: one is where both Billy and Nathan Bowen survived their encounters and the families grew close, and another has Billy and Tyrone working on the Roxxon Energy Platform under Mina Hess. While in Adina's custody, Connors confesses to Billy's body being buried in the horse stables at the fairground.

Aikku Jokinen
Aikku Jokinen is a fictional superhero appearing in American comic books published by Marvel Comics. The character was created by writer Jonathan Hickman and artist Stefano Caselli, and first appeared in Avengers (vol. 5) #4 (March 2013). She is a girl from Finland who bonded with an alien battle suit, initially using the Pod codename but now goes by Enigma.

Aikku was hiking and came across the armor of the being Ex Nihilo which proceeded to bond with Aikku, forming a cocoon that protected her. She was later found by the group Avengers Idea Mechanics where she finally hatched and flew to Australia to fight the Avengers only to be caught by A.I.M. again. The leader of A.I.M. turned out to be the superhero Sunspot who made Aikku (now going by the Pod name) a personal bodyguard and together joined the New Avengers. While being studied by Toni Ho, it is revealed that Aikku refuses to take the Pod armor off as it would effectively kill the Pod suit due to being a living sentient suit. It's also revealed that Aikku is depressed as her girlfriend Darja Vollun broke up with her. Toni herself began to fall in love with Aikku. They're suddenly attacked by the New Revengers who fatally wound Pod. With no other choice, the Pod armor sacrificing itself and ejects Aikku, however Aikku is able to retain the undersuit from Pod. Afterwards, Toni helped Aikku get used to her new suit and the two admitted feelings to each other.

Alongside the Iron Patriot, Aikku (now taking the Enigma alias) is a member of the U.S.Avengers when Avengers Idea Mechanics merges with the U.S. government to be the American Intelligence Mechanics. In their first mission, the team encountered the Secret Empire in a floating volcanic island base. They're later approached by a future version of future equivalent as Captain America when the Golden Skull arrived in their timeline to steal all the world's wealth. In Miami, Florida, the team crashes a charity gala only to discover that the wealthy CEOs were kidnapped and replaced by robots. During the battle, the team manages to defeat and capture the Golden Skull who was wearing a golden armored suit. Captain America then goes back to the future timeline with the Golden Skull as a prisoner. During the "Opening Salvo" part of the Secret Empire storyline, Aikku gets concerned about Toni who has been spending too much time with an upgraded Iron Patriot armor. During the event, the team arrives in Washington D.C. to confront Hydra when the Red Hulk begins to attack them, due to nanites that were injected in him which start to control him. When Enigma and Squirrel Girl end up in Paris and are attacked by Hydra Agents, they are saved by the Champions of Europe consisting of Ares, Captain Britain, Excalibur, Guillotine, Outlaw and Peregrine. They later help the Champions of Europe in raiding a Hydra base. After stealing some ships, Enigma, Squirrel Girl and the Champions of Europe manage to defeat the Hydra soldiers in Paris by destroying a Helicarrier and releasing other captured heroes. Enigma then makes contact with Toni who managed to break out of prison with Sunspot and Red Hulk, and makes plans to return to the US. In the aftermath, Squirrel Girl and Enigma are shown on a stakeout at the Project P.E.G.A.S.U.S. facility, where Enigma expresses concerns over Toni's decision to quit the Iron Patriot mantle. They later end up fighting the Plunderer and Blue Streak who were attempting to rob from the facility. While travelling through space with Smasher, Pod and the rest of the U.S.Avengers are attacked by space pirates known as warpjackers. After a brief fight, the pirates tell them that Glenbrook is actually the planet Kral X and that its ruler Ritchie Redwood is ruthless. Arriving in Kral X, the heroes manage to help Cannonball and the planet's rebels in overthrowing Ritchie. After restoring the planet's order, the heroes head home.

Aikku Jokinen's super-human suit that bonded to her allows flight, shield generation, invulnerability and the ability to adapt to its enemies attacks, and also includes a full arsenal such as laser beams and mines.

Jolen

Jolt
Jolt (Helen "Hallie" Takahama) is a fictional character, a superheroine appearing in American comic books published by Marvel Comics. Created by Kurt Busiek and Mark Bagley, the character has been depicted as a member of the Thunderbolts and Young Allies. She was a teenager when Onslaught attacked New York and killed her parents, leading her to be abducted by Arnim Zola and be subjected to experiments that gave her powers of heightened strength, speed and agility. After escaping, Helen went to Four Freedoms Plaza seeking the Fantastic Four, only to find the Thunderbolts were now living there. After they followed her into Zola's compound to rescue the other kidnapped children, she was accepted into the group, adopting the name Jolt. She died after being shot by Scourge, who had been coerced to eliminate all the Thunderbolts, and Techno took Jolt's body from the morgue hoping to investigate more on her biokinetic powers. His experiments, however, caused a regenerative effect that healed Jolt and brought her back to life. Jolt also got new powers, that allowed her to turn into pure biokinetic energy, enabling her to discharge energy blasts and fly.

Jolt in other media
 Jolt appears as downloadable content in Lego Marvel's Avengers as part of the "Thunderbolts" Pack.

Charlotte Jones

Gabe Jones

Hugh Jones

Jessica Jones

Piranha Jones
Raymond "Piranha" Jones is a supervillain appearing in Marvel Comics, primarily as a foe of Luke Cage.

The character first appeared in Luke Cage, Power Man #30 (April 1976), created by writer Don McGregor and artists Rich Buckler, Arv Jones and Keith Pollard. Ray Jones grew up in poverty and lost all of his teeth by the age of 15, and had them replaced with long, sharpened steel spikes. These, and his habit of using them on his enemies, gained him the nickname "Piranha". He became a criminal at an early age, and eventually allied with Dontrell "Cockroach" Hamilton.

Piranha Jones in other media
 Piranha appears in the Avengers: Earth's Mightiest Heroes episode "To Steal an Ant Man". This version had his whole mandible replaced with a mechanical jaw and works for William Cross.
 Raymond "Piranha" Jones appears in the second season of Luke Cage, portrayed by Chaz Lamar Shepherd. This version is the son of a prostitute employed by Harlem crime lord Maybelline "Mama Mabel" Stokes and childhood friend of Mariah Dillard who became a Wall Street broker and whose nickname is derived from his personal belief that a "little fish [that] you don't see coming" in the cutthroat world of stock trading. While working with Dillard to help her transition from her criminal activities to insider trading, Bushmaster kidnaps Jones before forcing him to bankrupt Dillard and executing him off-screen once he is done.

Rick Jones

Joseph
Joseph was briefly a member of the X-Men. Created by writer Scott Lobdell and artist Roger Cruz, he first appeared in The Uncanny X-Men #327 (December 1995).

Joseph is a clone of the X-Men's nemesis Magneto, possessing his magnetic powers, though he was originally intended to be an amnesiac Magneto. He had a brief courtship with Rogue before dying in battle with the actual Magneto. Joseph is later revived by Astra.

Fictional character biography

Joseph was discovered near a South American orphanage run by a nun known as Sister Maria. After several run-ins with "The Colonel", Joseph opted to leave the orphanage to protect the children. It was shortly after this that he encountered Rogue and saved her from the first wave of Bastion's "Operation Zero Tolerance". Rogue believed Joseph to be an amnesiac and mysteriously youthful Magneto. During this time, the X-Men first encountered the being known as Onslaught. Believing Magneto to be responsible, the Avengers sought Joseph out and figured out that he was not responsible nor was he like Magneto. Out of guilt for what he believed were his past sins, Joseph joined the X-Men in their war against Onslaught.

In an attempt to find out more about his past, Joseph encountered the Acolytes and their leader Exodus. They too believed that Joseph was Magneto and begged him to lead them. Exodus turned on Joseph when he noticed that Joseph was not the Magneto he knew. Joseph took on the identity of Magneto in order to convince the Acolytes that he truly was Magneto and ordered them to abandon their current activities. Exodus disagreed, but obeyed because he believed he saw a glimmer of the old Magneto within Joseph. Joseph returned to the X-Men, satisfied that he no longer was Magneto.

Shortly afterward, Joseph dedicated himself to reconstructing the Z'nox chamber to give Rogue some control over her powers. It was successful, to an extent, in that while standing under it, Rogue was unable to absorb the powers or psyche of another person. Immediately after this, Joseph and some of the X-Men were sent to the Shi'ar Galaxy in order to fight The Phalanx. When they returned to Earth, they were captured. In captivity, Joseph met the mutant Maggott, who had been saved by Magneto years before, and expressed his gratitude to the confused Joseph. Maggott discovered though that their captor Erik the Red was the real Magneto in disguise. Feeling that he owed Magneto for saving him, he did not tell the X-Men that Joseph was not Magneto.

Several weeks later, the Israeli agent Sabra appeared at the X-Mansion and wanted to kill "Magneto". Maggott revealed to her that Joseph wasn't Magneto, confirming Sabra's suspicions. Joseph left with Sabra to find out more about his past and Magneto's current whereabouts. He was kidnapped by Astra, who told Joseph his true origin where she was his creator by cloning him from Magneto's DNA. Astra sent Joseph against Magneto, who had publicly revealed himself. These events came to be known as the Magneto War. During this Magneto War, Joseph appeared to have sacrificed himself in order to repair the damage done by Magneto to Earth's electromagnetic field.

However, Astra revived Joseph, and implanted a record of Magneto's old memories, causing him to think as the true master of magnetism once did. Joseph announces his comeback by murdering 40 anti-mutant campaigners while wearing Magneto's costume, leaving the real Magneto to take the blame. Joseph has also assembled his version of the Brotherhood of Mutants consisting of himself, Astra, and mutated versions of Blob, Mastermind, Quicksilver, Scarlet Witch, and Toad. It is soon revealed that the mutated versions of Blob, Mastermind, Quicksilver, Scarlet Witch, and Toad are clones created by Astra. All the clones were killed by Magneto. Joseph is defeated by Magneto and remanded to Utopia's X-Brig.

Death
After the destruction of Utopia in the war between the Avengers and X-Men, Danger released all prisoners on the X-Brig, including Joseph. After the loss of Magneto, Joseph disguised himself as the Master of Magnetism and formed a new Brotherhood in the wake of the death of the X-Men. He brought them to an Air Force base in East Transia to stoke fear in humankind because of the spike in anti-mutant violence. But they were confronted by a new group of X-Men led by a resurrected Cyclops. After the battle, Joseph's ruse was revealed making Juggernaut mad because he thought the group was made to protect mutants. He attacked Joseph and held him down while Scott and him talked about ideologies. But before anyone could see what was going on, Joseph was killed by Kwannon who considered Joseph a threat to mutantkind.

Powers and abilities
As a clone of Magneto, Joseph possesses the superhuman power to generate extremely powerful magnetic fields. He can employ these magnetic fields to manipulate ferrous metals and to produce a number of other effects. He has also been shown to generate electricity and electromagnetic radiation. Joseph is capable of personal levitation/flight at high speeds, and often produces a protective magnetic aura around his own body. The real Magneto has on rare occasions been able to produce a wormhole using magnetism, and to safely teleport himself and others by means of the wormhole, but Joseph has not demonstrated a similar ability. It was revealed that the circumstances of his creation mean that he lacks the mental barriers that the original Magneto has established over the years to prevent himself from over-using his powers, with the result that Joseph can manipulate more energy than Magneto is capable of controlling on his own (Magneto requiring technological assistance to boost his powers to the same level as Joseph's full potential), at the cost of causing significant damage to Joseph if he pushes himself too far.

Josiah X

Josiah X is a fictional character, the son of Isaiah Bradley, the black Captain America, and the uncle of Elijah Bradley, the Patriot. The character was created by Christopher Priest and Joe Bennett, and debuted in The Crew #1.

Josiah is a Muslim minister. He replaced his last name Bradley with the letter "X". He has had many names including "Justice", the one he used as a hero. The "X" apparently symbolizes his allegiance to the Lost Tribe of Shabazz. Josiah runs a Muslim Mission in the "Mog" (Little Mogadishu) in Brooklyn, New York.

As depicted in the series Truth: Red, White & Black, the World War II Super Soldier program of 1942, operated by "Reinstein", used African American test subjects in a beta phase. The clandestine experimentation that empowered Josiah's father Isaiah Bradley held similarities with the Tuskegee Experiments. After a failed suicide mission to destroy the Super-Soldier efforts of the Nazis, Isaiah was court-martialed and imprisoned. While he was in prison, the government attempted to use his altered DNA to create another Super-Soldier. After 39 attempts they had a single success, which was Josiah. His surrogate mother smuggled him out from the government's watchful eye.

Josiah grew up alone in a Catholic orphanage outside of Boston. His powers revealed themselves when he lashed out at one of the orphanage nuns while in his early teens. Believing he had accidentally killed Sister Irenia, he fled. Under the assumed name of Josiah Smith he entered the U.S. Army.

Josiah served several tours in the Vietnam War, becoming a seasoned and experienced veteran. His unit, made up of primarily black soldiers, were nearly killed on a mission by an inconsiderate and racist officer's order to bomb the area while they were still on patrol. His assault on the heartless officer was rewarded with a court martial. Josiah was sent back to the States to serve out his sentence in Fort Leavenworth, a stateside military prison.

Blood tests at a secret research facility in Berkeley, California proved he was the missing Super-Soldier baby. His surrogate mother was brought in to confirm a genetic match, and she again helped him to escape. She also told him the truth about his past and the real first names of his genetic parents.

It was a long four years later before he could act on this knowledge. He came across a list of African-American individuals abused by the Super-Soldier project, and used it to find his parents' full names and their location.

After meeting his real parents, Josiah left the US and traveled abroad as a private military contractor and adventurer; he eventually ended up on the continent of Africa. It was in Africa that Josiah discovered the Islamic faith and decided to use it to find a purpose for his life.

Josiah became involved with James Rhodes' clandestine "Crew" after they were tricked into believing he was a criminal. After the usual superhero fight, Josiah joined them in order to seek out those who had not only framed him, but had also turned his neighborhood into a war zone.

When Iron Lad forms the Young Avengers, he attempts to recruit Josiah, but instead recruits his nephew Elijah Bradley when Josiah is unavailable.

Due to his unique genetic makeup, Josiah has aged very slowly. Although he is well over fifty years old, he appears to be twenty-five. His genetic code was manipulated with great precision to compensate for the side effects of unrefined Super Soldier serum. Josiah is extremely strong (able to bench press over 1100 pounds) and his body possesses phenomenal endurance. Because of his many years on the run from the U.S. government, Josiah has experience and training as both a soldier and mercenary. He also has decades of experience with a variety of martial arts styles, languages and weapons.

Josiah carries the scarred battle shield belonging to his father and predecessor Isaiah, similar to one used by Steve Rogers before receiving his vibranium-steel shield. It is an unpainted concave triangular metal shield with the Double V for Victory design. For protection he wears a loose chain mesh shirt over light padding. This mesh shirt is capable of blunting the impact of most small arms fire.

Joystick
Joystick is a fictional character created by Marvel Comics. She is the villainous alter ego of Janice Yanizeski. She debuted in The Amazing Scarler-Spider #2 (December 1995), designed by artist Mark Bagley.

Joystick is a participant of "The Great Game", a competition between costumed individuals sponsored by wealthy executives. When she is first introduced, she presents her "monitor" with the mask of fellow participant El Toro Negro. She is assigned a match in New York against Scarlet Spider. Joystick goes to the Daily Bugle looking for reporter Ken Ellis. She meets Phil Urich (without his costume). Scarlet Spider follows Ellis and is ambushed by Joystick. Phil Urich (as Green Goblin) saves Ellis as Ben Reilly still fights the woman. Meanwhile, in Paris, El Toro Negro attacks Joystick's "monitor", seeking revenge against her.

Phil Urich, the heroic Green Goblin, develops something of a crush on Joystick, a participant of "The Great Game". He dons the costume and visits Joystick's hotel room, where a package is assigned to "Scarlet Spider". He opens it anyway and receives a dose of some kind of gas. Somewhere else, Joystick takes notice of the hotel room situation in her van and learns El Toro Negro is after her as payback for his defeat. Green Goblin is attacked by Joystick, until El Toro Negro surprises them. Scarlet Spider soon arrives to defeat El Toro Negro while Phil Urich saves Joystick. Scarlet Spider scolds the Green Goblin for letting her go.

She is later seen in the Return of Kaine arc of the Clone Saga, fighting again against Ben Reilly (then under the Spider-Man identity) and his clone Kaine, with nPolestar. Ben Reilly jumps to defend Kaine and Muse against their assailants. Kaine defeats Rhino as Ben destroys Joystick's weapons and beats Polestar.

Later, she once again attacks Ben Reily when he invades a facility's installations. Soon after, when Ben Reilly stops an attempt on Jonah Jameson's life (courtesy of El Toro Negro), an all-out brawl happens between the three and mercenaries Chance and Cardiac. During a fierce melee battle, El Toro Negro unveils his role in the conspiracy to a beaten Joystick: he assumed the role of a rogue player in the game to divert attention to the hostile takeovers happening backstage. Joystick confesses that, despite the false pretenses of El Toro Negro's role, she still defeated him and took his mask.

Joystick much later becomes a member of the New Thunderbolts.

Jubilee

Jude the Entropic Man

Juggernaut

Junior Juniper

Junta

Justice

Vance Astrovik

John Roger Tensen

Justice Peace
Justice Peace is a cyborg agent of the Time Variance Authority.

 Other versions
In Warp World, a copy of the Marvel Universe folded in half during the Infinity Wars storyline, Justice Peace was fused with Carol Danvers, creating Captain Peace. She travels from the year 2099 to the present where she tells Weapon Hex (fusion between Scarlet Witch and X-23) that her victory against the Demon invasion caused the Martians to invade Earth.

References

Marvel Comics characters: J, List of